The Commonwealth Youth Parliament is an annual gathering hosted by the Commonwealth Parliamentary Association (CPA). It brings together young people aged 18–29 from across the Commonwealth of Nations to discuss issues of democracy and governance.

Each member parliament of the Commonwealth Parliamentary Association has the opportunity to nominate up to two delegates to attend the Commonwealth Youth Parliament.

The Commonwealth Youth Parliament rotates annually through the nine regions of the Commonwealth Parliamentary Association. The 7th Commonwealth Youth Parliament was held in 2015 in Darwin, Australia hosted by the Northern Territory Legislative Assembly. The 8th Commonwealth Youth Parliament was held in British Columbia, Canada in 2016. The 9th Commonwealth Youth Parliament was hosted by the States of Jersey in 2018. In 2019, the 10th Commonwealth Youth Parliament was hosted by the Delhi Legislative Assembly in India.

References

External links
 Official site

Commonwealth Family